Andreas Schauer (born 18 January 1986) is a German freestyle skier. He was born in Bad Tölz. He competed in ski cross at the World Ski Championships 2013, and at the 2014 Winter Olympics in Sochi, in ski-cross.

References

External links 
 
 
 
 
 

1986 births
Living people
Freestyle skiers at the 2014 Winter Olympics
German male freestyle skiers
Olympic freestyle skiers of Germany
People from Bad Tölz
Sportspeople from Upper Bavaria
21st-century German people